11th Regiment or 11th Infantry Regiment may refer to:

 11th Alpini Regiment, a unit of the Italian Army
 11th Hussars, a unit of the British Army
 11 Explosive Ordnance Disposal and Search Regiment RLC, a unit of the British Army's Royal Logistic Corps
 11th Infantry Regiment (United States), a unit of the United States Army
 11th Infantry Regiment (Philippine Army)
 11th Infantry Regiment (Greece)
 11th Infantry Regiment (USAFIP-NL)
 11th Marine Regiment (United States), a unit of the United States Marine Corps
 Devonshire Regiment, a unit of the United Kingdom Army
 11th Infantry Regiment (Thailand)

Armoured regiments 
 2/11th Armoured Car Regiment (Australia), a unit of the Australian Army
 11th Armoured Regiment (India)
 11th Armored Cavalry Regiment (United States), a unit of the United States Army
 1st-11th Cuirassier Regiment, a unit of the French Army
 1st Cuirassier Regiment (France), a unit of the French Army
 11th Tank Regiment, a unit of the Russian Armed Forces

American Revolutionary War regiments
 11th Regiment of Connecticut Militia
 11th Massachusetts Regiment
 11th Pennsylvania Regiment
 11th Virginia Regiment

American Civil War Regiments

Confederate (Southern) Army regiments
 11th Regiment Alabama Infantry
 11th Missouri Infantry Regiment (Confederate)

Union (Northern) Army regiments
 11th Iowa Volunteer Infantry Regiment
 11th Illinois Volunteer Infantry Regiment (3 Year)
 11th Illinois Volunteer Infantry Regiment (3 Month)
 11th Regiment Illinois Volunteer Cavalry
 11th Regiment Kentucky Volunteer Infantry
 11th Maine Volunteer Infantry Regiment
 11th Regiment Massachusetts Volunteer Infantry
 11th Michigan Volunteer Infantry Regiment
 11th Michigan Volunteer Infantry Regiment (reorganized)
 11th Michigan Volunteer Cavalry Regiment
 11th Minnesota Volunteer Infantry Regiment
 11th New Hampshire Volunteer Regiment
 11th New York Volunteer Infantry Regiment
 11th Ohio Infantry
 11th Pennsylvania Infantry
 11th West Virginia Volunteer Infantry Regiment
 11th Wisconsin Volunteer Infantry Regiment

See also
 11th Army (disambiguation)
 11th Division (disambiguation)
 11th Brigade (disambiguation)
 11 Squadron (disambiguation)